Allan "Butch" Lee (born October 28, 1929) was a Canadian ice hockey defenceman who played 28 seasons with the Pierson Bruins.

Awards and achievements
"Honoured Member" of the Manitoba Hockey Hall of Fame

External links

Butch Lee’s biography at Manitoba Hockey Hall of Fame

Ice hockey people from Manitoba
1929 births
Living people
20th-century Canadian people